The Constitution of 1848 is the constitution passed in France on 4 November 1848 by the National Assembly, the constituent body of the Second French Republic. It was repealed on 14 January 1852 by the constitution of 1852 which profoundly changed the face of the Second Republic and served as the basis for the Second French Empire.

Debates
16 delegates were chosen to debate the structure of the new constitution.  Present among them, was Alexis de Tocqueville author of Democracy in America.

Legislature
The delegates debated two types of legislature power, unicameral and bicameral legislatures.  Most arguments were given in support of a single legislative body. These included the belief that an additional house would only benefit an aristocracy in France.  Also, many delegates believed that two houses would slow the pace of political progress happening in France.  Tocqueville believed that two houses were necessary to prevent abuses by the executive power as well as prevent political passions from being exerted on the laws.

Timeline of French constitutions

References

Bibliography

External links
 
  (An introduction to French Constitution of 1848 by Karl Marx, including English translation of the most important Articles.)

https://en.wikisource.org/wiki/French_Constitution_of_1848

See also
 Constitution of France
 Politics of France
 Government of France

Constitutions of France
French Second Republic
1848 in France
Legal history of France
1848 documents